Matvey Janovich Martinkevich (born 2 November 2002), is a Russian and Serbian professional footballer who plays as a centre-forward for Loznica on loan from Vojvodina.

References

External links
 
 

2002 births
Living people
Russian footballers
Footballers from Moscow
Serbian SuperLiga players
Serbian First League players
FK Vojvodina players
FK Kabel players
FK Loznica players
Russian expatriate footballers
Expatriate footballers in Serbia
Russian expatriate sportspeople in Serbia
Association football forwards